The 2016–17 AHL season was the 81st season of the American Hockey League. The regular season began on October 14, 2016, and ended on April 15, 2017. The 2017 Calder Cup playoffs began on April 20, 2017.

Regular season
The AHL had a slight alignment shift with the addition of the Tucson Roadrunners to the one-year-old Pacific Division, bringing the division member total up to eight. It also created an unbalanced conference alignment with the Western Conference having 16 members and the Eastern Conference containing 14 members. Similar to the season scheduling in the previous season, the five California based teams, plus the new Tucson team, continue to play a 68-game season while the rest of the AHL teams play a 76-game season.

The AHL also changed the usage of home and away jerseys for the season. Before the Christmas break, home teams wear light jerseys and after the Christmas break, home teams wear dark jerseys. For the past several seasons, the visiting team wore light jerseys and the home team wore dark jerseys. Prior to the change in 2003, it was the opposite for many years.

Rule changes
The Board of Governors implemented some changes to further curb fighting in hockey. To prevent staged fights, any players involved in a fight prior to or immediately after a faceoff would be given a game misconduct which results in the player being ejected from the game. If a player accumulates ten fighting major penalties, the player would be suspended for one game following the tenth penalty and then suspended for one game after each subsequent fighting major penalty. If a player accumulates 14 fighting majors, the number of games suspended increases to two for each subsequent fighting major. Accumulated fighting majors do not include instances where the opposing player was assessed an instigator penalty.

Team changes

Relocations
The Springfield Falcons franchise was purchased by the National Hockey League's Arizona Coyotes and relocated to Tucson, Arizona, becoming the Tucson Roadrunners.
The Portland Pirates franchise was purchased by Springfield Hockey, LLC. and relocated to Springfield, Massachusetts to become the Springfield Thunderbirds. The franchise replaced the recently relocated Springfield Falcons. The Florida Panthers continue to serve as the franchise's NHL affiliate.

Renamed
On August 9, 2016, the reigning Calder Cup champion Lake Erie Monsters rebranded to become the Cleveland Monsters.

Playoff format
The 2017 playoff format retained a similar divisional format to the 2016 Calder Cup playoffs. The revised playoff format was finalized at the Annual Board of Governors meeting that took place July 2016. During the regular season, teams receive two points for a win and one point for an overtime or shootout loss. The top four teams in each division ranked by points percentage (points earned divided by points available) qualify for the 2017 Calder Cup Playoffs. The 2017 playoffs removed the divisional fifth-place qualifier exception used by the NHL and the AHL in 2015–16.

The 2017 Calder Cup Playoffs features a divisional playoff format, leading to conference finals and ultimately the Calder Cup Finals. The division semifinals are best-of-five series; all subsequent rounds are best-of-seven.

Standings 
Final standings
 indicates team has clinched division and a playoff spot
 indicates team has clinched a playoff spot
 indicates team has been eliminated from playoff contention

Eastern Conference

Western Conference

Statistical leaders

Leading skaters 
The following players are sorted by points, then goals. Updated as of April 14, 2017.

GP = Games played; G = Goals; A = Assists; Pts = Points; +/– = Plus-minus; PIM = Penalty minutes

Leading goaltenders 
The following goaltenders with a minimum 1500 minutes played lead the league in goals against average. Updated as of April 15, 2017.

GP = Games played; TOI = Time on ice (in minutes); SA = Shots against; GA = Goals against; SO = Shutouts; GAA = Goals against average; SV% = Save percentage; W = Wins; L = Losses; OT = Overtime/shootout loss

Calder Cup playoffs

AHL awards

All-Star Teams
First All-Star Team
Troy Grosenick (G) – San Jose
T. J. Brennan (D) – Lehigh Valley
Matt Taormina (D) – Syracuse
Kenny Agostino (F) – Chicago
Taylor Beck (F) – Bakersfield/Hartford
Wade Megan (F) – Chicago

Second All-Star Team
Zane McIntyre (G) – Providence
Tim Heed (D) – San Jose
David Warsofsky (D) – Wilkes-Barre/Scranton
Travis Boyd (F) – Hershey
Cory Conacher (F) – Syracuse
Chris Terry (F) – St. John's

All-Rookie Team
Casey DeSmith (G) – Wilkes-Barre/Scranton
Devon Toews (D) – Bridgeport
Kyle Wood (D) – Tucson
Jake Guentzel (F) – Wilkes-Barre/Scranton
Mark Jankowski (F) – Stockton
Danny O'Regan (F) – San Jose

See also
List of AHL seasons
2016 in ice hockey
2017 in ice hockey

References

External links
AHL official site

 
American Hockey League seasons
2016–17 in American ice hockey by league
2016–17 in Canadian ice hockey by league